Rekord Stadium is a sports venue in Irkutsk. It is the home of Baykal-Energiya.

References

Bandy venues in Russia
Sport in Irkutsk